Vesanto Melina (born 13 March 1942) is a Canadian Registered Dietitian and co-author of books that have become classics in the field of vegetarian, vegan, and raw foods nutrition, have sold almost a million copies in English and are in nine additional languages (Italian, Dutch, Traditional Chinese, Czech, French, Portuguese, Hebrew, Russian and Polish). She has presented talks and workshops on various aspects of vegetarian, vegan and raw foods and nutrition for dietitians, health professionals, and vegetarian associations in 17 American states and 9 Canadian provinces, and in 10 countries (in Europe-Paris, Copenhagen, Aarhus, Dresden, Ghent, Barcelona, Oxford, London, Edinburgh, Glasgow, Venice).

Early life

Melina was born on March 13, 1942, in Vancouver, British Columbia, with the given name Louise Elizabeth Goranson. Her parents were also both born in British Columbia. Her father was physiologist Ed Goranson, who specialized in diabetes working in the Toronto lab of Sir Frederick Banting and Charles H. Best. Banting and Best received a Nobel prize for the discovery of insulin. Dr. Goranson taught physiology at the University of Toronto and the University of British Columbia, and did cancer research at Princess Margaret Hospital and at Mill Hill in London, England. Her mother was teacher Margaret Goranson (née Humble) who taught at the University of British Columbia's Child Study Centre. Vesanto's sisters are Toronto actress Linda Goranson and stuntwoman Leslie Goranson, who was Annie Oakley in Disneyland Paris's "Buffalo Bill's Wild West Show". Melina studied nutrition at the University of London, England, and the University of Toronto, Ontario (1960–1964) and completed a master's degree in Nutrition at the University of Toronto, Ontario (1964–65). She married her childhood sweetheart, mathematician John Crawford, in 1964, and they had two children. The couple divorced in 1973. She spent four years at an ashram in Poona, India, between 1978 and 1981, changing her first name to Vesanto and traveled to Nepal four times before returning to British Columbia. She was married to David Melina from August 1994 to 2000. She has a grandson Chance (born December 2011), whose parents are Kavyo Crawford and Stefan Schielke. Since 2005, Vesanto's partner has been Cam Doré, who was executive director of The HOME Society in Abbotsford BC. She has lived at WindSong cohousing community in Langley, British Columbia, and since 2016, she and Cam Doré live at Vancouver Cohousing (https://vancouvercohousing.com).

Career
Melina taught nutrition at the University of British Columbia from 1965 to 1968 and did research with Dr. Thomas L. Perry on the inborn error of metabolism homocystinuria. She taught nutrition at the University of British Columbia in 1973–74. Between 1975 and 1978, she was a nutritionist with the health department of the government of British Columbia in Kelowna. Between 1978 and 1981 she lived in India and Nepal; becoming vegetarian in 1978 and becoming vegan in 1993. A motivation for her dietary choices was learning about the cruelty involved in the factory farming of animals, including boar-bashing of pigs (hitting them on the snout with a baseball bat or iron bar to force them into transport trucks), the debeaking of chickens, and the dragging off transport trucks of "downer" cows and calves. She returned to teach nutrition at the University of British Columbia, at Vancouver's Langara College and at Seattle's Bastyr University. She became increasingly interested in the topic of vegetarian nutrition and foods. She began teaching popular classes in vegetarian cooking and nutrition that received national media attention (CBC National News, Maclean's magazine). She received the Clintec award for leadership in dietetics. Melina was co-author of the American Dietetic Association's (ADA's ) and Dietitians of Canada's joint 2003 Position Paper on Vegetarian Diets. She is a member of Dietitians of Canada, College of Dietitians of British Columbia, the Academy of Nutrition and Dietetics (formerly the American Dietetic Association), the Washington State Dietetics Association, and the International Vegetarian Union. In 2012–2013, she was sponsored by Dietitians of Canada to do a cross-Canada tour, speaking to dietitians groups in Halifax, Ottawa, Toronto, Winnipeg, and Vancouver on two topics: "An Update on Vegetarian, Vegan and Raw Nutrition" and "The Effective treatment of Type 2 Diabetes with Vegan Diets". She has designed continuing education courses for health professionals for the Academy of Nutrition and Dietetics and is the lead author of their latest position Paper on Vegetarian Diets.

Books by Vesanto Melina
Her first book, Becoming Vegetarian, co-authored with Brenda Davis and Victoria Harrison, grew from her classes. It was published in 1993 in Canada, in the US in 1994, and in French (Devenir Végétarien) and Portuguese (A Dieta Saudável dos Vegetais). It was entirely revised in 2003 with co-author Brenda Davis, in the US was published as The New Becoming Vegetarian, in Canada as Becoming Vegetarian, in Czech (Pruvodce Vegetariana) and Dutch (Vegetarisch Eten). Melina's other books are Cooking Vegetarian with chef Joseph Forest; Becoming Vegan with Brenda Davis (In Italian as Diventare Vegani); Healthy Eating for Life to Prevent and Treat Cancer with Physicians Committee for Responsible Medicine; Raising Vegetarian Children with Jo Stepaniak (also in Traditional Chinese as完美寶貝健康蔬); The Food Allergy Survival Guide with Jo Stepaniak; The Raw Food Revolution Diet with Cherie Soria and Brenda Davis; and Becoming Raw with Brenda Davis. Her "Becoming Vegan: Express Edition" with Registered Dietitian Brenda Davis (The Book Publishing Company, 2013) is given star rating by the American Library Association as "the go-to book" on vegan nutrition, won a 2014 Canada Book Award  and received an honorable mention for ForeWord Book of the Year award in the U.S. (Health). A more extensive version, Becoming Vegan: Comprehensive Edition, is geared to health professionals.

Melina is a speaker, consultant, and media personality.

Books
Plant-Powered Protein by Brenda Davis, Vesanto Melina, and Cory Davis (The Book Publishing Company, April 2023.)
The Kick Diabetes Cookbook by Brenda Davis and Vesanto Melina (The Book Publishing Company 2018.)
Becoming Vegan: Comprehensive Edition by Brenda Davis and Vesanto Melina (The Book Publishing Company 2014)
Becoming Vegan: Express Edition by Brenda Davis and Vesanto Melina (The Book Publishing Company, 2013)
Cooking Vegan by Vesanto Melina, and Joseph Forest (The Book Publishing Company 2012)
Becoming Raw by Brenda Davis, and Vesanto Melina (The Book Publishing Company 2010)
Cooking Vegetarian by Vesanto Melina, and Joseph Forest (John Wiley and Sons 1998, Macmillan Canada 1996; entirely updated Wiley Canada 2011, HarperCollins 2013)
Healthy Eating for Life to Prevent and Treat Cancer with Physician's Committee for Responsible Medicine (Wiley 2002)
Raising Vegetarian Children by Jo Stepaniak and Vesanto Melina (McGraw-Hill 2003)
Food Allergy Survival Guide by Vesanto Melina, Jo Stepaniak, and Dina Aronson (Healthy Living Publications 2004)
The Raw Food Revolution Diet by Cherie Soria, Brenda Davis, and Vesanto Melina (The Book Publishing Company 2008)
The New Becoming Vegetarian by Vesanto Melina and Brenda Davis(The Book Publishing Company 2003)
Becoming Vegan: The Complete Guide to Adopting a Healthy Plant-Based Diet by Brenda Davis and Vesanto Melina (The Book Publishing Company 2000)
Becoming Vegetarian by Vesanto Melina, Brenda Davis, and Victoria Harrison (Macmillan Canada 1994, The Book Publishing Company 1995, updated with Wiley Canada 2003; HarperCollins 2013 )

References

4. Melina V. Five Decades: From Challenge to Acclaim. Can J Diet Pract Res
. 2016 Sep;77(3):154-8. https://dcjournal.ca/doi/full/10.3148/cjdpr-2016-015.

5. Melina V, Craig W, Levin S. Position of the Academy of Nutrition and Dietetics: Vegetarian Diets. J Acad Nutr Diet. 2016 Dec;116(12):1970-1980. https://pubmed.ncbi.nlm.nih.gov/27886704/

1942 births
Canadian cookbook writers
Canadian food writers
Canadian veganism activists
Dietitians
Langara College people
Living people
Plant-based diet advocates
Raw foodists
Academic staff of the University of British Columbia
Vegan cookbook writers
Writers from Vancouver